Zeydar or Zaidar or Zidar may refer to:
 Zeydar, North Khorasan
 Zeydar, South Khorasan